The 2017 Australian Formula Ford Series was an Australian motor racing series open to Formula Ford and Formula Ford 1600 cars. It was the 48th Australian Formula Ford Series and was sanctioned by the Australian Auto Sport Alliance (AASA).

The series was won by Max Vidau driving a Mygale SJ1019.

Race calendar
The series was contested over six rounds with three races at each round.

Series standings
The series was won by Max Vidau driving a Mygale SJ1019.

Notes
 Liam McLellan finished Race 1 at Sandown in second however he was excluded due to a technical infringement.

References

Australian Formula Ford Series
Formula Ford Series